The Guinea-Bissau Air Force is the air force arm of the military of Guinea-Bissau.

History
On leaving Bissalanca by 1973–74, the Portuguese Air Force left three North American T-6Gs. After achieving independence from Portugal, the air force was formed by officers returning from training in Cuba and the USSR.  The FAGB was re-equipped by the Soviet Union with a limited aid package in which its first combat aircraft were introduced. Five MiG-17s, two MiG-15UTI trainers and a single Mi-8 helicopter entered service.

In 1978 France provided more aircraft aid in the form of a Reims-Cessna FTB.337 for coastal patrol and a surplus Alouette III.  A Dassault Falcon 20F was donated by the Angolan government but was soon sold to the USA. In the late 1980s, a similar number of MiG 21s replaced the MiG 17s, also delivered an An-24, a Yak-40 and another Mi-8 helicopter. In the early 1990s they received ex-Polish PZL-Mielec Lim-6 Fresco fighter bombers from Poland and East Germany.

The force's title was changed to Força Aérea da Guiné-Bissau (FAGB) after the outbreak of the civil war in 1998. Cooper and Weinert state 'when sighted for the last time in...1991, most of the [MiG] fleet was in 'storage' inside several hangars on the military side of Bissalanca IAP (Osvaldo Vieira International Airport), and in a deteriorating condition.'

As of 2015 Guinea-Bissau has no aircraft in flying condition, with the last known type a SE.3105 helicopter, which ceased operating in 2011.

Aircraft condition 
The status of most of the aircraft is unknown. All of the current aircraft are "in storage" at Osvaldo Vieira International Airport along with retired aircraft like the An-2 and Yakovlev Yak-40. The MiG-21s, MiG-17s, MiG-15s and Alouette IIs can be seen in the multiple hangars.

Aircraft

Current inventory
Air Force has only a Cessna 150

Former inventory:, MiG-17, MiG-15, Alouette III, Falcon 20, Alouette II Yakovlev Yak-40, Dornier Do 27, PZL-Mielec Lim-6, North American T-6, Antonov An-2, Reims-Cessna FTB.337, Douglas DC-3, Antonov An-26, Mil Mi-4.

References

External links
globalsecurity.org

Air Force
Military aviation in Africa
Guinea-Bissau
Air force